Glyphodiscus is a genus of echinoderms belonging to the family Goniasteridae.

The species of this genus are found in Malesia and Australia.

Species:

Glyphodiscus magnificus 
Glyphodiscus pentagonalis 
Glyphodiscus perierctus

References

Goniasteridae
Asteroidea genera